Bertrand Roth (12 February 1855 – 24 January 1938) was a Swiss composer and pianist.

Life 
Born in Degersheim in the toggenburg region of Germany, Roth moved with his family to Plauen in 1858, after his father, an embroidery designer, had been commissioned to set up the first embroidery factory in Germany there. After attending grammar school, he began to study philosophy before turning to music and enrolled at the University of Music and Theatre Leipzig. In 1877, he moved as a pupil from Franz Liszt to Weimar, whom he accompanied on two trips to Pest and Rome.

In 1879, Roth appeared for the first time as soloist at the "Allgemeiner Deutscher Musikfest" in Wiesbaden. In 1880 he was appointed as a piano teacher at the Hoch Conservatory in Frankfurt. There he was one of the founders of the Raff Conservatory, of which he was co-director. Roth, who in the following years gave concerts in many cities in Germany, Italy and again and again in Switzerland, went to Dresden in 1884 as a piano virtuoso, teacher and composer. At the Dresden "Royal Conservatory" he gave piano lessons as a special subject since 1885. Among the pupils he taught, who received a "prize certificate" for their achievements as piano players, was Georg Pittrich. From 1901 to 1930, Roth held around 300 Sunday matinees with works by contemporary composers in the "Musiksalon Bertrand Roth" in Dresden. In 1903, he was appointed Royal Professor.

Roth was dedicated a street in Plauen on his 75th birthday in 1925: the Bertrand-Roth-Straße in 08525 Plauen.

Roth's compositional work includes songs, piano and string music.

Roth died in Bern at the age of 73.

The estate of Roth is kept in the Saxon State and University Library Dresden.

Further reading 
 Walther Killy, Rudolf Vierhaus (ed.): Deutsche Biographische Enzyklopädie. Vol. 8. K. G. Saur Verlag, Munich 1996, .
 Fritz Ruch: "Bertrand Roth (1855 –1938) ein Liszt-Schüler, der während 45 Jahren in Dresden lebte und wirkte," in SLUB-Kurier, 12. Jahrgang, issue 3, 1998, .
 Fritz Ruch: Betrand Roth. Das Leben und Wirken eines Liszt-Schülers. PAN, Basel/Kassel 1998, .

References

External links 
 

19th-century classical composers
20th-century classical composers
Swiss classical pianists
1855 births
1938 deaths
19th-century Swiss musicians
20th-century Swiss composers